Pediatrics International is a peer reviewed journal for pediatrics, published in English by the Japan Pediatrics Society.

Pediatrics journals
Publications with year of establishment missing
Wiley-Blackwell academic journals
Bimonthly journals